Tysen Jay Bolding (born February 27, 1986), known professionally as Money Man (Big money), is an American rapper. In 2020, he released his hit single "24", which peaked at number 49 on the U.S. Billboard Hot 100, from his eighteenth mixtape Epidemic (2020).

Career
After the success of his 2016 songs "Boss Up", "How It Feel" and his Black Circle mixtape trilogy, Bolding signed with Cash Money Records and Republic Records in 2017, and released Secret Society, Harvest Season and Grow God mixtapes before he bought out his contract in 2018.

In 2019, Money Man released Paranoia mixtape, which peaked at number 36 on the Billboard 200 album chart, followed by another successful project, a collaborative mixtape Long Money, with Peewee Longway. In 2020, Money Man released Epidemic and State of Emergency, mixtapes alluding to the COVID-19 outbreak, the former containing the single "24", which later saw a remix being released with Lil Baby.

Discography

Mixtapes

Singles

Notes

Guest appearances

References

External links 

Money Man discography at Spinrilla

1986 births
Living people
21st-century American rappers
Rappers from Atlanta
Cash Money Records artists